Arman Darchinyan (born 30 April 1994) is an Armenian boxer.

Darchinyan qualified to represent Armenia in the 2020 Tokyo Olympics' boxing middleweight division. He beat Slovakia's Andrej Csemez 5-0 and awaits the quarterfinals on August 1.

Personal life 
Darchinyan is married and has a daughter. His uncle Vic Darchinyan was also an Olympic boxer, who represented Armenia in the flyweight category at the 2000 Sydney Olympics.

References 

1994 births
Living people
People from Vanadzor
Boxers at the 2020 Summer Olympics
European Games competitors for Armenia
Boxers at the 2019 European Games
Armenian male boxers
Olympic boxers of Armenia